Nund Rishi ( c. 1377 – c. 1438 AD; sometimes spelled Nund Reshi), also known as Sheikh Noor-ud-Din Noorani, Sheikh-Ul-Alam (spritual guide of the world) and by the title Alamdar-e-Kashmir ("Flag Bearer of Kashmir"), was a Kashmiri Sufi saint, mystic, poet and Islamic preacher. Nund Rishi was among the founders of the Rishi order, a Sufi tradition of the region. He influenced many spiritual teachers and saints, including Hamza Makhdoom, Resh Mir Sàeb, and Shamas Faqir.

Early life

Noor-ud-Din was born in AD 1377 in [khi-jogi pora] or [qaimoh] village in Kulgam district to Salar Sanz and Sadra, also called Sadra Moji or Sadra Deddi. His grandfather "Sheikh Salah-Ud-Din" hailed from Kishtwar. The legend has it that he refused to be breast-fed by his mother after birth and it was Lalleshwari who breastfed him. In teenage years Noor-ud-Din was apprenticed to a couple of traders. He was married to Zai Ded who hailed from the village of Dadasara, Tral and had two sons and a daughter with her. She renounced the world after the death of her children and became a hermit.

Noor-ud-Din renounced the worldly life at the age of 30 and retired to live a life of meditation in a cave which is still shown in Qaimoh and is about 10 feet deep. During his last days, he survived by drinking a cup of milk every day, and later, he used to survive by drinking water.

Literary works
Noor-ud-Din spread his teachings or message through poems, commonly known as shruks. His poems have four to six lines each and evolve around religious themes, highlight moral principles and often call for peace. He strived for Hindu–Muslim unity. One of his prominent poem is Ann poshi teli yeli wan poshi, which translates as "Food will thrive only as long as the woods survive".

A Kashmiri poetess Lal Ded was his contemporary and had a great impact on his spiritual growth. Some scholars argue that he was her disciple, and associate his poetry with the Bhakti movement, although others disagree.

Noor-ud-Din witnessed several transmissions of Hinduism and Islam in the valley throughout his life, although he was actively involved in philosophical work and in writing Kashmiri poems. In his verses, he recalled some events, including arrival of Mir Sayyid Ali Hamadani to Kashmir.

Noor-ud-Din is also credited with translating the Quran into Kashmiri language.

In 2015, the university of Kashmir published an Urdu book titled "Kalam-i-Sheikh-ul-Alam", comprising about 300 shruks of Nund Rishi translated into Urdu by Ghulam Muhammad Shad.

Death
Noor-ud-Din died in 1438 at the approximate age of 63. Sultan Zain-ul-Abidin commissioned a tomb for his body at Charari Sharief. The Charar-e-Sharief shrine is visited by pilgrims to this day, especially on the eve of Noor-ud-Din's urs. His Urs will be observed on 23 October 2022, this day has been declared gazetted holiday by the government. 

The Afghan governor Atta Muhammad Khan minted coins with Noor-ud-Din's name.

Noor-ud-Din's father Sheikh Salar-Ud-Din and two brothers Kamal-Ud-Din and Jamal-Ud-Din are buried near Dadasara while his wife is buried in Qaimoh.

Legacy

Noor-ud-Din's sayings and verses are preserved in Kashmir region, including in a museum built at Kashmir university. The shruks also describe the life of the saint. They were translated into the Persian language by Baba Nasib-ud-din Ghazi two centuries after his death. In 1998, University of Kashmir established an institute called Markaz-e-Noor Centre for Sheikh-ul-Alam Studies to conduct scientific research on Noor-ud-Din's life. In 2015, the university established a research center called Sheikh-ul-Alam Chair in order to honor his teachings. The centre is aimed at exploring the social and cultural background of the Kashmiri Rishis. In 2017, the Jammu and Kashmir Academy of Art, Culture and Languages covered his life in a book titled "Hayat-e-Sheikh-ul-Alam" (life of Nund Rishi). In 2005, the Government of India renamed the Srinagar airport to Sheikh ul-Alam International Airport and granted it international status.

See also 
Abdul Qadir Gilani.

Mir Sayyid Ali Hamadani.

Baba Naseeb-ud-Din Ghazi.

Baba Haneef Ud Din Reshi

References

Notes

Kashmiri people
Kashmiri poets
1377 births
1440 deaths
Dard people
People from Kulgam district
Kashmiri Sufi saints